Monachather, common name mulga oats, is a genus of Australian plants in the grass family.

Species
The only known species is Monachather paradoxus.

References

External links

Grassbase - The World Online Grass Flora

Arundinoideae
Endemic flora of Australia
Monotypic Poaceae genera